Trecate is a comune (municipality) in the Province of Novara in the Italian region Piedmont, located about  northeast of Turin and about  east of Novara.

It harbors a major refinery complex for fuels and liquefied petroleum gas (LPG), serving northern and central Italy.

It is served by Trecate railway station.

Among its churches are:
Santa Maria Assunta - main parish church
San Francesco - Contains frescoes by il Cerano
Sanctuary of the Madonna delle Grazie
Oratory del Gonfalone

Castle of Trecate 
The town of Trecate used to have a castle within its territory, this castle was similar to both Warkworth Castle and the Castle of Cuasso al Monte (also disappeared), in Cinque Vette Park.

Twin towns — sister cities
Trecate is twinned with:

  Saint-Paul-Trois-Châteaux, France (2003)

References

External links
 Official website

Cities and towns in Piedmont